On Liberty is a philosophical essay by the English philosopher John Stuart Mill. Published in 1859, it applies Mill's ethical system of utilitarianism to society and state. Mill suggests standards for the relationship between authority and liberty. He emphasizes the importance of individuality, which he considers prerequisite to the higher pleasures—the summum bonum of utilitarianism. Furthermore, Mill asserts that democratic ideals may result in the tyranny of the majority. Among the standards proposed are Mill's three basic liberties of individuals, his three legitimate objections to government intervention, and his two maxims regarding the relationship of the individual to society.

On Liberty was a greatly influential and well-received work. Some classical liberals and libertarians have criticized it for its apparent discontinuity with Utilitarianism, and vagueness in defining the arena within which individuals can contest government infringements on their personal freedom of action. The ideas presented in On Liberty have remained the basis of much political thought. It has remained in print since its initial publication. A copy of On Liberty is passed to the president of the British Liberal Democrats as a symbol of office.

Mill's marriage to Harriet Taylor Mill greatly influenced the concepts in On Liberty, which was published shortly after she died.

Composition
According his autobiography, On Liberty was first conceived as a short essay in 1854. As the ideas developed, the essay was expanded, rewritten and "sedulously" corrected by Mill and his wife, Harriet Taylor Mill. After suffering a mental breakdown and eventually meeting and subsequently marrying Harriet, Mill changed many of his beliefs on moral life and women's rights. Mill states that On Liberty "was more directly and literally our joint production than anything else which bears my name."

The final draft was nearly complete when his wife died suddenly in 1858. Mill suggests that he made no alterations to the text at this point and that one of his first acts after her death was to publish it and to "consecrate it to her memory." The composition of this work was also indebted to the work of the German thinker Wilhelm von Humboldt, especially his essay On the Limits of State Action. Finally published in 1859, On Liberty was one of Mill's two most influential books (the other being Utilitarianism).

Overview

Introduction
John Stuart Mill opens his essay by discussing the historical "struggle between authority and liberty," describing the tyranny of government, which, in his view, needs to be controlled by the liberty of the citizens. He divides this control of authority into two mechanisms: necessary rights belonging to citizens, and the "establishment of constitutional checks by which the consent of the community, or of a body of some sort, supposed to represent its interests, was made a necessary condition to some of the more important acts of the governing power." Because society was—in its early stages—subjected to such turbulent conditions (i.e. small population and constant war), it was forced to accept rule "by a master." However, as mankind progressed, it became conceivable for the people to rule themselves. Mill admits that this new form of society seemed immune to tyranny because "there was no fear of tyrannizing over self." Despite the high hopes of the Enlightenment, Mill argues that the democratic ideals were not as easily met as expected. First, even in democracy, the rulers were not always the same sort of people as the ruled. Second, there is a risk of a "tyranny of the majority" in which the many oppress the few who, according to democratic ideals, have just as much a right to pursue their legitimate ends.

In Mill's view, tyranny of the majority is worse than tyranny of government because it is not limited to a political function. Where one can be protected from a tyrant, it is much harder to be protected "against the tyranny of the prevailing opinion and feeling." The prevailing opinions within society will be the basis of all rules of conduct within society; thus there can be no safeguard in law against the tyranny of the majority. Mill's proof goes as follows: the majority opinion may not be the correct opinion. The only justification for a person's preference for a particular moral belief is that it is that person's preference. On a particular issue, people will align themselves either for or against that issue; the side of greatest volume will prevail, but is not necessarily correct. In conclusion to this analysis of past governments, Mill proposes a single standard for which a person's liberty may be restricted:

That the only purpose for which power can be rightfully exercised over any member of a civilized community, against his will, is to prevent harm to others. His own good, either physical or moral, is not a sufficient warrant.... Over himself, over his body and mind, the individual is sovereign.

Mill clarifies that this standard is solely based on utility, not on natural rights. According to Mill, children and "barbarian" nations are benefited by limited freedom. Just despots, such as Charlemagne and Akbar the Great, were historically beneficial to people not yet fit to rule themselves.

J. S. Mill concludes the Introduction by discussing what he claimed were the three basic liberties in order of importance:

The freedom of thought and emotion. This includes the freedom to act on such thought, i.e. freedom of speech
The freedom to pursue tastes (provided they do no harm to others), even if they are deemed "immoral"
The freedom to unite so long as the involved members are of age, the involved members are not forced, and no harm is done to others

While Mill admits that these freedoms could—in certain situations—be pushed aside, he claims that in contemporary and civilised societies there is no justification for their removal.

Of the liberty of thought and discussion
In the second chapter, J. S. Mill attempts to prove his claim from the first chapter that opinions ought never to be suppressed. Looking to the consequences of suppressing opinions, he concludes that opinions ought never to be suppressed, stating, "Such prejudice, or oversight, when it [i.e. false belief] occurs, is altogether an evil; but it is one from which we cannot hope to be always exempt, and must be regarded as the price paid for an inestimable good." He claims that there are three sorts of beliefs that can be had—wholly false, partly true, and wholly true—all of which, according to Mill, benefit the common good:

Mill spends a large portion of the chapter discussing implications of and objections to the policy of never suppressing opinions. In doing so, Mill explains his opinion of Christian ethics, arguing that, while they are praiseworthy, they are incomplete on their own. Therefore, Mill concludes that suppression of opinion based on belief in infallible doctrine is dangerous. Among the other objections Mill answers is the objection that the truth will necessarily survive persecution and that society need only teach the grounds for truth, not the objections to it. Near the end of Chapter 2, Mill states that "unmeasured vituperation, enforced on the side of prevailing opinion, deters people from expressing contrary opinion, and from listening to those who express them."

On individuality as one of the elements of well-being
In the third chapter, J. S. Mill points out the inherent value of individuality since individuality is ex vi termini (i.e. by definition) the thriving of the human person through the higher pleasures. He argues that a society ought to attempt to promote individuality as it is a prerequisite for creativity and diversity. With this in mind, Mill believes that conformity is dangerous. He states that he fears that Western civilization approaches this well-intentioned conformity to praiseworthy maxims characterized by the Chinese civilization. Therefore, Mill concludes that actions in themselves do not matter. Rather, the person behind the action and the action together are valuable. He writes:

On the limits to the authority of society over the individual
In the fourth chapter, J. S. Mill explains a system in which a person can discern what aspects of life should be governed by the individual and which by society. Generally, he holds that a person should be left as free to pursue his own interests as long as this does not harm the interests of others. In such a situation, "society has jurisdiction over [the person's conduct]." He rejects the idea that this liberty is simply for the purpose of allowing selfish indifference. Rather, he argues that this liberal system will bring people to the good more effectively than physical or emotional coercion. This principle leads him to conclude that a person may, without fear of just punishment, do harm to himself through vice. Governments, he claims, should only punish a person for neglecting to fulfill a duty to others (or causing harm to others), not the vice that brought about the neglect.

J. S. Mill spends the rest of the chapter responding to objections to his maxim. He notes the objection that he contradicts himself in granting societal interference with youth because they are irrational but denying societal interference with certain adults though they act irrationally. Mill first responds by restating the claim that society ought to punish the harmful consequences of the irrational conduct, but not the irrational conduct itself which is a personal matter. Furthermore, he notes the societal obligation is not to ensure that each individual is moral throughout adulthood. Rather, he states that, by educating youth, society has the opportunity and duty to ensure that a generation, as a whole, is generally moral.

Where some may object that there is justification for certain religious prohibitions in a society dominated by that religion, he argues that members of the majority ought make rules that they would accept should they have been the minority. He states, "unless we are willing to adopt the logic of persecutors, and say that we may persecute others because we are right, and that they must not persecute us because they are wrong, we must beware of admitting a principle of which we should resent as a gross injustice the application to ourselves." In saying this, he references an earlier claim that morals and religion cannot be treated in the same light as mathematics because morals and religion are vastly more complex. Just as with living in a society which contains immoral people, Mill points out that agents who find another's conduct depraved do not have to socialise with the other, merely refrain from impeding their personal decisions. While Mill generally opposes the religiously motivated societal interference, he admits that it is conceivably permissible for religiously motivated laws to prohibit the use of what no religion obligates. For example, a Muslim state could feasibly prohibit pork. However, Mill still prefers a policy of society minding its own business.

Applications
This last chapter applies the principles laid out in the previous sections. He begins by summarising these principles:

Economy
Mill first applies these principles to the economy. He concludes that free markets are preferable to those controlled by governments. While it may seem, because "trade is a social act," that the government ought intervene in the economy, Mill argues that economies function best when left to their own devices. Therefore, government intervention, though theoretically permissible, would be counterproductive. Later, he attacks government-run economies as "despotic." He believes that if the government ran the economy, then all people would aspire to be part of a bureaucracy that had no incentive to further the interests of any but itself.

Preventing harm
Next Mill investigates in what ways a person may try to prevent harm. He first admits that a person should not wait for injury to happen, but ought try to prevent it. Second, he states that agents must consider whether that which can cause injury can cause injury exclusively. He gives the example of selling poison. Poison can cause harm. However, he points out that poison can also be used for good. Therefore, selling poison is permissible. Yet, due to the risk entailed in selling poison or like products (e.g. alcohol), he sees no danger to liberty to require warning labels on the product. Again, Mill applies his principle. He considers the right course of action when an agent sees a person about to cross a condemned bridge without being aware of the risk. Mill states that because the agent presumably has interest in not crossing a dangerous bridge (i.e. if he knew the facts concerned with crossing the bridge, he would not desire to cross the bridge), it is permissible to forcibly stop the person from crossing the bridge. He qualifies the assertion stating that, if the means are available, it is better to warn the unaware person.

With regard to taxing to deter agents from buying dangerous products, he makes a distinction. He states that to tax solely to deter purchases is impermissible because prohibiting personal actions is impermissible and "[e]very increase of cost is a prohibition, to those whose means do not come up to the augmented price." However, because a government must tax to some extent in order to survive, it may choose to take its taxes from what it deems most dangerous.

Repeat offences to public through private action
Mill expands upon his principle of punishing the consequences rather than the personal action. He argues that a person who is empirically prone to act violently (i.e. harm society) from drunkenness (i.e. a personal act) should be uniquely restricted from the drinking. He further stipulates that repeat offenders should be punished more than first time offenders.

Encouraging vice
On the subject of fornication and gambling, Mill has no conclusive answer, stating, "[t]here are arguments on both sides." He suggests that while the actions might be "tolerated" in private, promoting the actions (i.e. being a pimp or keeping a gambling house) "should not be permitted." He reaches a similar conclusion with acts of indecency, concluding that public indecency is condemnable.

Suicide and divorce
Mill continues by addressing the question of social interference in suicide. He states that the purpose of liberty is to allow a person to pursue their interest. Therefore, when a person intends to terminate their ability to have interests it is permissible for society to step in. In other words, a person does not have the freedom to surrender their freedom. To the question of divorce, Mill argues that marriages are one of the most important structures within society; however, if a couple mutually agrees to terminate their marriage, they are permitted to do so because society has no grounds to intervene in such a deeply personal contract.

Education
Mill believes that government run education is an evil because it would destroy diversity of opinion for all people to be taught the curriculum developed by a few. The less evil version of state run schooling, according to Mill, is that which competes against other privately run schools. In contrast, Mill believes that governments ought to require and fund private education. He states that they should enforce mandatory education through minor fines and annual standardised testing that tested only uncontroversial fact. He goes on to emphasise the importance of a diverse education that teaches opposing views (e.g. Kant and Locke). He concludes by stating that it is legitimate for states to forbid marriages unless the couple can prove that they have "means of supporting a family" through education and other basic necessities.

Conclusion
J. S. Mill concludes by stating three general reasons to object to governmental interference:
 if agents do the action better than the government.
 if it benefits agents to do the action though the government may be more qualified to do so.
 if the action would add so greatly to the government power that it would become over-reaching or individual ambition would be turned into dependency on government.

He summarises his thesis, stating:

Reception

On Liberty was enormously popular in the years following its publication. Thomas Hardy recalled later in life that undergraduates in the 1860s knew the book almost by heart. Criticisms of the book in the 19th century came chiefly from thinkers who felt that Mill's concept of liberty left the door open for barbarism, such as Thomas Carlyle, James Fitzjames Stephen and Matthew Arnold.

In more recent times, although On Liberty garnered adverse criticism, it has been largely received as an important classic of political thought for its ideas and accessibly lucid style. Denise Evans and Mary L. Onorato summarise the modern reception of On Liberty, stating: "[c]ritics regard his essay On Liberty as a seminal work in the development of British liberalism. Enhanced by his powerful, lucid, and accessible prose style, Mill's writings on government, economics, and logic suggest a model for society that remains compelling and relevant." As one sign of the book's importance, a copy of On Liberty is the symbol of office for the president of the Liberal Democrat Party in England.

The historian Peter Marshall described On Liberty as "one of the great classics of libertarian thought", due to its exaltation of individual freedoms.

Contradiction to utilitarianism
Mill makes it clear throughout On Liberty that he "regard[s] utility as the ultimate appeal on all ethical questions", a standard he inherited from his father, a follower of Jeremy Bentham. Though J. S. Mill claims that all of his principles on liberty appeal to the ultimate authority of utilitarianism, according to Nigel Warburton, much of the essay can seem divorced from his supposed final court of appeals. Mill seems to idealize liberty and rights at the cost of utility. For instance, Mill writes:

This claim seems to go against the principle of utilitarianism, that it is permissible that one should be harmed so that the majority could benefit.

Warburton argues that Mill is too optimistic about the outcome of free speech. Warburton suggests that there are situations in which it would cause more happiness to suppress truth than to permit it. For example, if a scientist discovered a comet about to kill the planet in a matter of weeks, it may cause more happiness to suppress the truth than to allow society to discover the impending danger.

While David Brink concedes that Mill's apparently categorical appeal to rights seems to contradict utilitarianism, he points out that Mill does not believe rights are truly categorical because Mill opposes unrestrained liberty (e.g. offensive public exposure).

Furthermore, David Brink tries to reconcile Mill's system of rights with utilitarianism in three ways:

 Rights are secondary principles to the Greatest Happiness Principle
 Rights are incomparable goods, justifying their categorical enforcement
 Liberty is a good. Thus, those who suppress it are worthy of punishment. Rights deal with the value of punishing/protecting others' interference with liberty, not the actual protection of liberty

Narrow focus
Some thinkers have criticised Mill's writing for its apparent narrow or unclear focus in several areas. Mill makes clear that he only considers adults in his writing, failing to account for how irrational members of society, such as children, ought to be treated. Yet Mill's theory relies upon the proper upbringing of children. Plank has asserted that Mill fails to account for physical harm, solely concerning himself with spiritual wellbeing. He also argues that, while much of Mill's theory depends upon a distinction between private and public harm, Mill seems not to have provided a clear focus on or distinction between the private and public realms.

Religious criticism
Nigel Warburton states that though Mill encourages religious tolerance, because he does not speak from the perspective of a specific religion, some claim that he does not account for what certain religious beliefs would entail when governing a society. Some religions believe that they have a God given duty to enforce religious norms. For them, it seems impossible for their religious beliefs to be wrong, i.e. the beliefs are infallible. Therefore, according to Warburton, Mill's principle of total freedom of speech may not apply.

Conception of harm
The harm principle is central to the principles in On Liberty. Nigel Warburton says that Mill appears unclear about what constitutes harm. Early in the book, he claims that simply being offensive does not constitute harm. Later, he writes that certain acts which are permissible and harmless in private are worthy of being prohibited in public. This seems to contradict his earlier claim that merely offensive acts do not warrant prohibition because, presumably, the only harm done by a public act which is harmless in private is that it is offensive.

Warburton notes that some people argue that morality is the basis of society, and that society is the basis of individual happiness. Therefore, if morality is undermined, so is individual happiness. Hence, since Mill claims that governments ought to protect the individual's ability to seek happiness, governments ought to intervene in the private realm to enforce moral codes.

Charges of racism and colonialism
Mill is clear that his concern for liberty does not extend to all individuals and all societies. He states that "Despotism is a legitimate mode of government in dealing with barbarians". Contemporary philosophers Domenico Losurdo and David Theo Goldberg have strongly criticised Mill as a racist and an apologist for colonialism. However, during his term as a Member of Parliament, he chaired the extraparliamentary Jamaica Committee, which for two years unsuccessfully sought the prosecution of Governor Eyre and his subordinates for military violence against Jamaican Blacks.

See also 
 The Subjection of Women

Bibliography

 
 
 
 
 
 
 
 
 

 

 
 
On Liberty and The Subjection of Women
The Basic Writings of John Stuart Mill On Liberty, The Subjection of Women & Utilitarianism
All Minus One: John Stuart Mill’s Ideas on Free Speech Illustrated, a condensed and illustrated version of Chapter 2 of On Liberty designed for students

References

External links
 , a faithful copy of the fourth edition published in 1869 by Longmans, Green, Reader and Dyer.
 
On Liberty at Project Gutenberg, derived from an edition by Walter Scott Publishing with an introduction by W. L. Courtney
 
 On Liberty at the Internet Archive, a digital facsimile of the first edition.
On Liberty: A Translation into Modern English Ebook 
Joel Feinberg's heavily annotated copy of Mill’s On Liberty available online at the Princeton University Digital Library.

1859 books
Classical liberalism
Political books
Books about liberalism
Libertarian books
Works about utilitarianism
Works by John Stuart Mill
Books by John Stuart Mill